Muthiah Chettiar Chidambaram Muthiah (19 October 1929 – 18 September 2006) was an Indian industrialist, banker and philanthropist  who served as the Chairman of the Indian Overseas Bank from 1954 to 1969.

Early life 

Muthiah was born on 19 October 1929 to industrialist M. Ct. M. Chidambaram Chettyar and C. Valliammai Achi. He had his schooling at The Doon School, Dehradun and graduated from University of Allahabad. Muthiah did his M.B.A. in Chicago. Muthiah has a younger brother M. Ct. Pethachi.

Career 

Muthiah took over the family business in 1954 on the early death of his father in an aeroplane crash. Muthiah served as the Chairman of the Indian Overseas Bank from 1954 until its nationalisation in 1969. He also served as the Chairman of the United Fire and General Insurance company and was President of the Southern Indian Chamber of Commerce and Industry. Muthiah also served as President of the Andhra Pradesh State Finance Corporation and was one of the directors of Indian Bank.

Trustee
He was president of the Trust Boards that run the M.Ct.M. Boys and Lady M.Ct. M. Girls Schools, besides Sir M.Ct. Trust Centenary School.

Death 

Muthiah died in his sleep on 18 September 2006 due to a heart disease.

References 

1929 births
2006 deaths
The Doon School alumni
Indian bankers
Businesspeople from Chennai
University of Allahabad alumni
20th-century Indian philanthropists